The Arapawa Sheep is a breed of feral sheep found primarily on Arapaoa Island in the Marlborough Sounds, New Zealand, where they have probably been isolated since they were introduced in 1867.  Although there are many theories of how the sheep arrived, it is generally accepted that they are descendants of Merino strains from Australia.  The New Zealand Rare Breeds Conservation Society classifies this breed as "rare".  This breed is raised primarily for wool.

Characteristics
The fiber is of Merino-like fineness.

Due to living in a rather hostile and very steep terrain, this breed often looks hunched over as they carry their head and tail down most often.  They have a light build and long legs making them a rather active breed. The head and face are narrow and clear while the ears are slender.  
Most often, the Arapawa displays all black.  However, quite often, white points are displayed.  On rare occasions, an all-white sheep can be observed.  "Cocktail" Arapawas are those that are white spotted.

References

Sheep breeds
Sheep breeds originating in New Zealand
Feral sheep